Llaqta Qulluy (Quechua llaqta place (village, town, city, country, nation), qulluy to die out, become extinct; to fail, "extinct town", also spelled Llaqta Qolloy) is an archaeological site in Peru. It is situated in the Huancavelica Region, Huancavelica Province, Acoria District.

References 

Archaeological sites in Peru
Archaeological sites in Huancavelica Region